Al-e Kabud (also Romanized as Āl-e Kabūd; also known as Alakabūd, Alā Kabūd, Āleh Kabūd, and Allākabūd) is a village in Howmeh Rural District, in the Central District of Bijar County, Kurdistan Province, Iran. At the 2006 census, its population was 75, in 18 families. The village is populated by Kurds.

References 

Towns and villages in Bijar County
Kurdish settlements in Kurdistan Province